Salina High School may refer to:

Salina High School Central, known as Salina High School before the construction of Salina High School South
Salina High School South